Breaking the Language Barrier is a 1961 American short documentary film. It was nominated for an Academy Award for Best Documentary Short. Hermon Lee Knox served as Director of Photography.

According to a declassified National Reconnaissance Office document, "Although the film failed to win an Oscar when the Academy of Motion Picture Arts and Sciences presented its annual awards on April 9, 1962, Headquarters APCS and the 1352nd Photographic Group received plaques honoring the nomination of the film for consideration in the competition. In the 1962 competition held by the magazine Industrial Photography for motion pictures in the In-Plant Category, Breaking the Language Barrier, selected as the USAF entry, tied with The Idea of Michigan (Univ. of Michigan Television Center) as the best general public-relations films.  The announcement of the award was made in September 1962.

See also
 List of American films of 1961

References

External links

1961 films
1961 documentary films
1961 short films
1960s short documentary films
American short documentary films
1960s English-language films
1960s American films